Odessa Township may refer to:

 Odessa Township, Jewell County, Kansas
 Odessa Township, Rice County, Kansas, in Rice County, Kansas
 Odessa Township, Michigan
 Odessa Township, Big Stone County, Minnesota
 Odessa Township, Buffalo County, Nebraska
 Odessa Township, Hettinger County, North Dakota, in Hettinger County, North Dakota
 Odessa Township, Ramsey County, North Dakota, in Ramsey County, North Dakota
 Odessa Township, Edmunds County, South Dakota, in Edmunds County, South Dakota

Township name disambiguation pages